Meeghan Holaway is an American actress/singer working in theatre, film and television.  She originated the role of Florence Greenberg in the Broadway musical Baby It's You!. Her first television appearance was on Everybody Loves Raymond. She is best known for guest and recurring roles on a number of notable TV series.

Early life 
Holaway was born in Seattle.  She has a B.A. from Pomona College in Claremont, California, where she graduated with honors and became a Rhodes Scholarship finalist and a member of Phi Beta Kappa.

Career 
After graduation, Holaway worked in New England and New York doing regional theatre, including the Oldcastle Theatre Company in Bennington, Vermont. She also sang with a 1950s cover band and various cabaret groups. She played Beth in the first run of the Pulitzer Prize winning play, Dinner With Friends Off-Broadway. She moved to Los Angeles and began working in TV and film, playing guest and recurring roles on a number of series, including NCIS, Cold Case, Criminal Minds, Law & Order, Two and a Half Men, Without a Trace, Switched at Birth and Grey's Anatomy.

References

External links 
 

American film actresses
Living people
Year of birth missing (living people)
American musical theatre actresses
American television actresses
American stage actresses
Actresses from Seattle
Pomona College alumni
20th-century American actresses
21st-century American actresses